Mowday is a surname. Notable people with the surname include:

Bruce Mowday, American local historian and politician
Chris Mowday (born 1981), Australian baseball player